Joe Stephen Gatting (born 25 November 1987) is a first-class cricketer and former footballer who played for Hampshire until he was released at the end of the 2015 season. Gatting previously played football for Brighton & Hove Albion as a striker before being released on 31 October 2008. He however returned to football part-time for one season with Whitehawk. He is the current student mentor at Seda College SA Multi, Edwardstown.

Gatting attended Cardinal Newman Catholic School in Hove, followed by Brighton College. Gatting has also played for Sussex County Cricket Club's academy. Gatting is the son of former Brighton & Hove Albion defender Steve Gatting and nephew of former England cricket captain Mike Gatting.

Football career

Gatting came through the youth ranks at Brighton & Hove Albion garnering a reputation as a prolific goalscorer. Gatting made his first team debut against Southampton on 2 January 2006.

On 13 September 2007, Gatting joined Conference National side Woking on loan for 3 months after finding first-team opportunities at the Albion difficult after the arrival of summer signing Nicky Forster.

Gatting returned to Brighton in December 2007 and once again found it difficult to find first-team opportunities.

At the start of the 2008–09 season, Gatting joined Conference South side Bognor Regis Town on a month's loan.

After failing to make an appearance during the 2008–09 season, Gatting was released from Brighton on 31 October 2008, before leaving football altogether to take up a career in cricket.

Gatting semi-returned to football however in 2010, signing part-time for Whitehawk. In 2014–15 season, he is playing for Peacehaven & Telscombe FC, members of the Ryman Isthmian Football League.

Cricket career

Joe decided to quit professional football and signed non-contract terms with Sussex, following his uncle, Mike Gatting into cricket.

Gatting scored a century on his debut for Sussex making 110 against Surrey in the Pro ARCH Trophy in Dubai. He then scored 152 during his 1st Class Debut for Sussex against Cambridge at Fenners in the opening match of the 2009 domestic season. A successful start to the season continued at Hove in the Friends Provident Trophy, when on successive days Gatting hit 34 from 47 balls against Surrey, following it up with his maiden List A half century against Durham on Monday 12 May, a round 50 from 61 balls. On 30 August 2009 Gatting was on 99 not out against Yorkshire when the game was abandoned due to rain.

At the end of the 2015 season, it was announced that Gatting was one of three players who were being released by Hampshire as their contracts expired. He had played two seasons after leaving Sussex.

References

External links

1987 births
Living people
Sportspeople from Brighton
English cricketers
English footballers
English Football League players
National League (English football) players
Association football forwards
Brighton & Hove Albion F.C. players
Woking F.C. players
Whitehawk F.C. players
Sussex cricketers
Hampshire cricketers
People educated at Brighton College
Northumberland cricketers